Club Alianza Lima, popularly known as Alianza Lima or simply Alianza, is a Peruvian professional sports club based in La Victoria District of Lima, Peru. The club was founded under the name of Sport Alianza on 15 February 1901 by working-class youth in the Chacaritas neighborhood of Lima. It is widely known for having one of the most historical and successful football teams in Peru; they have won a total of twenty-five league titles of the Peruvian Primera División and are currently the oldest team playing in that competition, since the club was founded in 1901.

Alianza's home stadium is the Estadio Alejandro Villanueva, named after Alejandro Villanueva, one of the most important players in the club's history. The stadium is also popularly known as Matute, name of the neighbourhood in which it is located.

Alianza enjoyed success throughout the first decades of their professional era. Their best international performance came in 1976 when they won the Copa Simón Bolívar. In that same year, the team reached the semi-finals of the Copa Libertadores, repeating the feat in 1978.

In 1987, tragedy struck Alianza when the entire squad and coaching staff died in an airplane crash as the team returned from an away fixture.

Alianza Lima has had a huge, long-standing rivalry with Universitario de Deportes, another popular team in Lima. Other traditional rivals include Sporting Cristal, Deportivo Municipal, and Sport Boys.

The club has a women's volleyball team that participates in the Liga Nacional Superior de Voleibol.

History

Foundation & early years 

The club was founded under the name of Sport Alianza on 15 February 1901 by working-class youth in the Chacaritas neighborhood of Lima. The Alianza name was in reference to the Alianza Racing Horse Stud, where their first matches were played. The stud was located on the same street, Cotabambas, in Lima

The club is one of the oldest professional football teams in Peru. It was founded on 15 February 1901, as Sport Alianza, named for the stable that hosted its first games. It is the only surviving founding member of the Peruvian Football League, created as an amateur level league in 1912. The club's first kit was green and white, honoring founding member Eduardo Pedreschi's Italian heritage. Beginning in that first season, the colors of the Alianza stables, blue, white and black were used, and by the 1920s the classic vertically-striped jersey had become the definitive kit. The club changed its name to Alianza Lima in 1920. The League turned professional in 1951.

Alianza participated in the amateur era of the Peruvian football league from that inaugural season, winning its first title in 1918. During its first years, it played irregularly against other teams from Lima and the port of Callao. Its matches against Atlético Chalaco from Callao stirred interest as a clash between limeños and chalacos. Sport Alianza had started to become a popular team drawing large support and this was the first derby or "clasico".

Alleged four-in-a row 
The Alianza Stud changed owners and locations continuously and, consequently, the team was forced to relocate in turn, until 1928, when under the new name Alianza Lima, the club settled at the third block of the Manco Capac avenue in the La Victoria District, where it would stay and become the emotional home-base for club and fans alike.

That same year Alianza played against the Federación Universitaria (University Federation) for the first time. This club which would later be renamed Universitario de Deportes and become Alianza's greatest rivals, in what is today the most important Peruvian derby.

The 1930s brought great joy and frustration to the team. In 1931, 1932, 1933 and 1934, Alianza Lima won four championships in a row, for the first and so far only time in Peruvian football. However the Peruvian Football Federation did not recognize the championship of 1934 as won by Alianza. The championship was awarded to the club's biggest rival, Universitario.

The memory of the four-in-a-row was tainted by the club's relegation in 1938, but after one season in the Lima Provincial League, one of the de facto first division leagues, the team returned to the First Division.

Titles and cup performances

During the 1940s, and start of the professional era in the 1950s, 1960s and 1970s, Alianza would win 10 championships. The club won two Peruvian titles in a row in 1977 and 1978, when its players formed the majority of the Peru national football team. The team had its greatest success at the international level in the 1976 and 1978 Copa Libertadores, in which managed to reach the semi-finals but lost to Deportivo Cali 1–4. Since then, its Copa Libertadores campaigns were not successful, during the 1990s the club managed to reach round of 16 several times including a semi-finals participation in the 1999 Conmebol's Copa Merconorte losing to penalty shootout against Colombian side America de Cali the same way it had been defeated by Uruguay's Peñarol a year before in the 1998 Copa Libertadores. Then had one of its worst campaigns in 2007, until the 2010 edition, when they did a great campaign even defeating the defending champion Estudiantes de la Plata by 4–1 in Lima, being one of the three top teams at the end of the first round however, in the Round of 16, they lost the chance to advance further with Universidad de Chile, after a controversial match in Chile, where Ecuadorian referee Carlos Vera gave the Chilean side a goal that had already been flagged by the sideline referee as offside and the play had been called off, however Universidad de Chile's coaching staff including teammates and the pressure of a large local crowd seem to have given referee Carlos Vera the fast initiative to validate the goal, Alianza Lima had been eliminated in what Peruvian media and other South American media believed to be a robbery, Fox Sports network and ESPN agreed the play should not have been validated, Alianza Lima's president Guillermo Alarcon flew to Asuncion, Paraguay to speak to Conmebol and claiming a straight entry to the next Copa Libertadores, the case was also taken to FIFA headquarters but was not approved. In the 2011 preliminary phase of the Copa Libertadores Alianza Lima came into the tournament as Peru's 3rd place having to face Mexico's Jaguares de Chiapas in a back to back home and away matches for a pass to the Cup's group stage but would lose both games 2–0 and lost a chance to participate . This 2012 version of the Copa Libertadores, Alianza Lima will participate in group 5 as Peru's No. 2 seed against Nacional (Uruguay), Vasco da Gama (Brazil) and the winner of Ecuador's 3rd and Paraguay's 3rd.
Arriba Alianza

1980s decade
The 1980s were probably the most bitter years in the club's history. During the first years of the decade, despite having very good players, Alianza could not obtain titles, some which were snatched by Sporting Cristal, which was establishing itself as one of the three big football clubs of Peru.

1987 air tragedy

In 1987, Alianza Lima was first in the standings with a few matches left, and it looked like a new title would be obtained, but tragedy got in the way. On 8 December of that year, Alianza made a trip to Pucallpa to play against Deportivo Pucallpa for the league. The match was won 1–0, with Carlos Bustamante scoring. The team took a charter flight for the trip back. The flight departed on 8 December in a Peruvian Navy Fokker F27 airplane, which crashed into the sea when it was a few kilometers away from the Lima-Callao Airport, close to the Ventanilla district in Callao. The only survivor was the pilot, all the players and coaching staff died, being a game away from conquering another title.

Alianza finished the championship playing with members of the youth team and a few players on loan from Chile club Colo-Colo, which had offered to help sending four players (José Letelier, Parko Quiroz, Francisco Huerta and René Pinto). Friendship between both teams has been strong since then. Alianza could not keep the first place and its greatest rival, Universitario de Deportes, obtained the title.

The team had to restart from scratch and even former players who had already retired, like Teófilo Cubillas, or others who were about to, like César Cueto, played to help the club get out of these bitter times.

Alianza Lima was close to relegation in 1988, but it managed to hold on in the last matches. In the next few years, despite being competitive, it failed to obtain a title.

The titles and the centenary and the 2021 title
In 1997, Alianza Lima obtained its first title after 18 years, under Colombian manager Jorge Luis Pinto. In 1999 it came in second place, after losing to Universitario in the finals. In the early hours 2000, tragedy struck again when young captain Sandro Baylón died in a car accident after crashing with a post while driving under the influence of alcohol.

In 2001 the club celebrated its centenary and obtained the national title after beating Cienciano in Cusco on penalty kicks. Later on, Alianza Lima would win the 2003 and 2004 championships, defeating Sporting Cristal in both finals, this time under Argentinian manager Gustavo Costas. In 2006 Alianza Lima again won the championship beating Cienciano del Cusco in the final play-off, enabling them to play the Copa Libertadores. In  2017, Alianza Lima won its first championship in over a decade by winning both the Apertura and Clausura and, thus, did not require playing in the final playoffs. Along with Sporting Cristal, Alianza Lima has been the most successful Peruvian club in this century, having won five championships.

At the end of 2020, Alianza was relegated to the second division, despite the fact that in that year all games were played in just Lima and Callao because of the COVID-19 epidemic and teams from the provinces were not able to use their home stadiums. As soon as the season ended, Alianza launched a campaign to try to remain in the first division. There was contention about the team that had finished one place above Alianza, Carlos Stein. The Peruvian FA gave them a fine. Alianza argued that this was not enough, since Alianza's interpretation of the regulation was that they should be docked points.  The Peruvian Football Association disagreed explaining that both fines and point reductions were allowed and used with other teams during the competition depending on the level of infraction by the team , and confirmed Alianza’s relegation. Then, Alianza took their case all the way to Switzerland, to the International Court of Arbitration for Sport. Eventually CAS decided in favor of Alianza and the team was returned to the first division and Carlos Stein sent to the second division despite the fact that the new season (2021) had already kicked off, and Carlos Stein had played a match.

Eventually, the regular 2021 season ended with a two legged play off against Sporting Cristal. Alianza beat Sporting Cristal in the first game 1-0 and tied the second game 0-0 to become the champions for 2021. Carlos Stein, meanwhile, came through a penalty shoot out at the end of a play off in the second division and won promotion back to the first division again for 2022. 

Alianza Lima finished in fourth place for the 2022 Torneo Apertura and first in the Torneo Clausura. Due to coming in second in the aggregate table, they received a bye in the semi-finals of the championship playoffs. Melgar beat Sporting Crystal 2-0 in each leg, coming out 4-0 winners on aggregate to set up a showdown with Alianza Lima for the 2022 Liga 1 title. The first leg was played in Melgar's stadium in Arequipa and Alianza lost 1-0 due to a Yordi Vílchez own goal. Yordi Vílchez made up for it by tying the series on aggregate with a header right before halftime in the second leg. Pablo Lavandeira then popped up to score a header of his own in the 74th minute to give Alianza a 2-1 aggregate lead. They held on to that lead and won back-to-back league titles for the first time since their 2003 and 2004 league title triumphs. This was, according to Peru's official records, Alianza Lima's 25th league title win, while Alianza will refute that this was their 26th. This was also their seventh title since the turn of the century, a record only matched by Crystal.

Kit and crest

The team's home colours consists of a shirt with navy blue and white vertical stripes, navy blue shorts and navy blue socks. Its away colours are not commonly used nor well established, playing sometimes in blue, white or green.

During the month of October, as a tribute to the Lord of Miracles, patron of the team, the regular colours are switched to purple and white. The color purple is often associated with the religious image and its procession.

Stadium

 
Alianza Lima plays its home games at the Estadio Alejandro Villanueva, also known as Matute for the neighbourhood it is located in. Construction was announced on 15 February 1951, the club's 50th anniversary. The land where the stadium was built was donated by Manuel Odría, then-President of Peru. Financial problems however, delayed the beginning of construction. It was only until 30 May 1969 that construction commenced. Uruguayan architect Walter Lavalleja was responsible for the project, with a contribution by Alfonso De Souza-Ferreyra.  

The stadium was inaugurated on 27 December 1974, with a match between Alianza and Nacional of Uruguay in front of a crowd of 36,966 spectators. The match ended 2–2.

On 4 December 2010, the stadium became the first in Peru to own an LED screen in high definition. Likewise, it was also at the time the only national sports arena that had a digital banner intended for advertising in 101 square meters.

According to a survey carried out by the University of Lima, the Estadio Alejandro Villanueva is the most unsafe stadium in Peru to play football. This is particularly due to it being located in one of the most dangerous neighbourhoods of Lima. Because of this, the stadium has a video-monitoring center and is equipped with 50 high-tech security cameras located in different areas throughout, including both grandstands and the interior and exterior. It is the only venue in Peru with the type of security.

Supporters

Alianza Lima's supporters are the largest in Peru. Alianza Lima's "Barra Brava" are called the Comando Svr (spelled with a "V" instead of a "U", intending to avoid the initial of bitter rivals Universitario). In years 2001, 2002 and 2003 Apoyo Opinión y Mercado conducted a comparative research about the composition of the Peruvian supporters: According to the survey, 76% of the respondents supported a football team and 24% had no preference. In 2001, results placed Alianza Lima first with 42% of the answers followed by Universitario with 35%. In 2002, the numbers varied but not significantly. Alianza Lima got 43% Universitario 37% and Sporting Cristal 13% of the answers. Alianza for 2003 reached nearly 50% of preferences compared with 31% of Universitario and 17% of Sporting Cristal. For socio-economic levels, Alianza won in A, C, D and E class, while the Universitario was leader in B class. The research found that Alianza's supporters grow when the respondents where of down living standards (in the E class have the 63%).

In a study of the Compañía Peruana de Estudios de Mercado y Opinión Pública called "Profile of children and adolescents" between men and women from 11 to 17 years in Lima, Alianza wins with the 50% of preferences, followed by Universitario with 37%. Sporting Cristal won the 8% and other teams joined a 5%.

In 2004, a study of the Compañía Peruana de Investigación de Mercados (CPI) gives them the first place in terms of preferences at the population of Lima. 29.7% of the respondents revealed that they're fans of Alianza. The same study indicates that 27.8% is a fan of Universitario de Deportes. Meanwhile, a 9.2% indicated to be a fan of Sporting Cristal, 3.0% of Cienciano del Cusco, 2.7% of the Sport Boys Callao, 1.1% of the Municipal Sports and a 24.4% did not sympathize with any team.

Despite the continuing controversy over which team is the most popular (between Alianza and Universitario) a survey of Apoyo Opinión y Mercado in 2006 revealed that 54% of Peruvians where soccer fans, and ensures that Alianza Lima owns 35% of the preferences, followed by Universitario, with 32%, and bit further away, Sporting Cristal with 17%, while the remaining teams have a combined 11%.

Also in 2006, in Trujillo, another survey revealed that Alianza Lima where 26% owned, 25% Universitario, 13% Sporting Cristal, Cienciano 7%, César Vallejo 4% Other 2% None 20% No 4% accurate.

In 2007, a survey conducted by the Grupo de Opinión Pública de la Universidad de Lima, allowed to ratify the results of previous years. Alianza Lima leads the polls with 31% followed by 22.6% of Universitario, Sporting Cristal 9.3%, 5.5% Cienciano, Sport Boys Deportivo Municipal and 2.1% 1.1%. In the same survey by socioeconomic level, Alianza won B, C, D and E classes. Universitario, marked differences in class A.

In 2007 too, a study conducted by Arellano Márketing Investigación y Consultoría in 5,300 Peruvians of various ages and socioeconomic backgrounds from 16 cities, gives the first place to Alianza with the 38.3% of preferences, followed by Universitario (34.3%) above appears Sporting Cristal with 15.4% of preferences, and other teams have a combined 13.3%.

In February 2008, the University of Lima revealed Alianza Lima enjoyed, like in previous years, the highest popularity, although this time by a narrower margin. Alianza won with the 29.6% against 29.5% of Universitario. It must be said that the survey was conducted in Metropolitan Lima and Callao. In 2008 also, according to a nationwide survey conducted by ICC, Universitario won with the 38.3% of preferences, Alianza 33.5%, and Sporting Cristal 14.5%.

In October of the same year, Alianza lead preferences with 40% in Lima and Callao, according to a study by Grupo de Opinión Pública de la Universidad de Lima. The survey also revealed that 4 out of 10 Peruvians was a fan of Alianza. The escort teams where Universitario and Sporting Cristal with 35.5% and 13.5%. The list is completed with Cienciano del Cusco with 3.3% to 2.1% Coronel Bolognesi, Sport Boys Callao with 1.7% and 1.1% with Deportivo Municipal. The remaining teams occupy 0.5%.

A survey of the Pontificia Universidad Catolica del Peru between November and December 2008 confirmed that Alianza is the most popular team with the 27% preference in Lima and Callao. Universitario was 21%, and Sporting Cristal 8%. The remaining teams joined by 3%. The survey conducted by the home study was conducted in 15 major urban provinces of Peru. In this regard, Alianza led again with a total 24%, followed by Universitario (20%), Sporting Cristal (9%) Cienciano (3%), FBC Melgar (2%) and Sport Boys (1%) . 35% of those questioned claimed to have no sympathy whatsoever. A survey conducted by Ipsos support between 17 and 19 December 2008, Universitario ranked first in popularity with 34%, one percentage point below Alianza Lima with 33%. The survey was conducted of 515 people older than 18 years and residents of the 16 main cities.

In 2009, CPI released another poll indicating the Universitario was the most popular team in Peru with 38.6% while Alianza reached 33.1%. A survey conducted by Grupo de Opinión Pública de la Universidad de Lima in February 2009, said that Alianza Lima ranked first in popularity with 27.2% below Universitario with 26.6%. The list continue with Sporting Cristal (10.3%), Sport Boys (3.4%), Cienciano (2.4%), Deportivo Municipal (0.4%), Universidad San Martín (0.4%).

In 2014, a research done by the "Euromericas Sport Marketing" agency, ranked Alianza Lima as the most popular soccer team in South America and the second most popular in Latin America. Fans's loyalty to Alianza Lima cannot be matched in the continent, that it even surpassed other big soccer teams from Argentina and Brazil like Boca Juniors and Corinthians.

Rivalries

Alianza Lima has had a long-standing rivalry with Universitario, Sporting Cristal, and Sport Boys. Alianza Lima has defeated Universitario 140 times and lost 122 times against them. There were 103 draws.

Players

Current squad

Out on loan

Former players

  Alfonso Yañez
  Walter Zevallos

Honours

National

League
Peruvian Primera División:
Winners (25): 1918, 1919, 1927, 1928, 1931, 1932, 1933, 1934, 1948, 1952, 1954, 1955, 1962, 1963, 1965, 1975, 1977, 1978, 1997, 2001, 2003, 2004, 2006, 2017, 2021, 2022
Runner-up (21): 1930, 1934, 1935, 1937, 1943, 1953, 1956, 1961, 1964, 1971, 1982, 1986, 1987, 1993, 1994, 1996, 1999, 2009, 2011, 2018, 2019

Torneo Apertura/Fase 1: 
Winners (5): 1997, 2001, 2004, 2006, 2017
Runner-up (4): 1999, 2002, 2003, 2018

Torneo Clausura/Fase 2: 
Winners (7): 1997, 1999, 2003, 2017, 2019, 2021, 2022
Runner-up (4): 1998, 2002, 2014, 2018

Torneo Regional:
Runner-up (2): 1986, 1990–II

Torneo Interregional: 
Winners (1): 1977

National cups
Torneo del Inca: 
Winners (1): 2014
Runner-up (1): 2015

Copa de Campeones del Perú: 
Winners (1): 1919

Regional
Liga Provincial de Lima: 
Winners (1): 1939

International
Copa Simón Bolívar:
Winners (1): 1976

Under-20 team
Torneo de Promoción y Reserva:
Winners (2): 2011, 2022
Runner-up (2): 2013, 2018

Copa Generación: 
Runner-up (1): 2021

Friendly International
Copa Ciudad de Rosario:
Winners (1): 2011

Copa El Gráfico-Perú:
Winners (2): 1999, 2003
Runner-up (1): 2002-I

Copa Marlboro:
Runner-up (1): 1990

Copa EuroAmericana:
Winners (1): 2014

Performance in CONMEBOL competitions
Copa Libertadores: 29 appearances
1963, 1964, 1966, 1972, 1976, 1978, 1979, 1983, 1987, 1988, 1994, 1995, 1997, 1998, 2000, 2002, 2003, 2004, 2005, 2007, 2010, 2011, 2012, 2015, 2018, 2019, 2020, 2022, 2023
Semi-finals (2): 1976, 1978

Copa Sudamericana: 4 appearances
2002: Quarter-finals
2003: Preliminary Round
2014: First Stage
2017: First Stage

Copa CONMEBOL: 1 appearance
1996: First round

Copa Merconorte: 4 appearances
1998: Group Stage
1999: Semi-finals
2000: Group Stage
2001: Group Stage

U-20 Copa Libertadores: 2 appearances
2011: Fourth Place
2012: Quarter-finals

Copa Libertadores Femenina: 2 appearances
2021: Quarter-finals
2022: Group Stage

Women’s football
Liga Femenina: 
Winners (2): 2021, 2022

Campeonato Metropolitano de Fútbol Femenino:
Runner-up (1): 2019

Women’s volleyball
Liga Nacional Superior de Voleibol: 
Runner-up (2): 2020–21, 2021–22

Records
Félix Suárez at 6 seconds from the start of the match scored the fastest goal ever in a Copa Libertadores. The game was a 1976 Copa Libertadores match between Alianza Lima and Independiente Santa Fe from Colombia. Alianza went on to win the match by a score of 3–0.
Juan Valdivieso, a notable goalkeeper in Alianza Lima, once played a match as a forward and scored 7 goals in 1 game.
Alianza Lima holds the record for the largest win in Peruvian football by defeating Sport Pilsen 11–0 in 1984.
Alianza Lima is the oldest club in the Peruvian First Division with 103 participations.

Top scorers

Presidents

Managers

Winning managers

Other managers

 Alejandro Villanueva (1940–41)
 Roberto Scarone (1958–59)
 Hugo Bagnulo (1969–70)
 Dan Georgiadis (1972), (1976)
 Didi (1986)
 Teófilo Cubillas (1988)
 Miguel Company (1989)
 Pedro Dellacha (1992)
 Ivica Brzić (1994–95), (2001)
 Julio César Uribe (1995)
 Gil (1996)
 Jorge Luis Pinto (1999–00)
 Arthur Bernardes (2000)
 Paulo Autuori (2001)
 Franco Navarro (2002)
 Rubén Darío Insúa (2005)
 Wilmar Valencia (2005)
 Diego Aguirre (2007)
 José Soto (2008)
 Richard Páez (2008)
 José Soto (2012)
 Wilmar Valencia (2013)
 Guillermo Sanguinetti (2014–15)
 Gustavo Roverano (2015)
 Roberto Mosquera (2016)
 Miguel Ángel Russo (2019)

References

External links
 Official club website
 
 
 
 

 
Football clubs in Lima
Association football clubs established in 1901
Works association football teams